Giuseppe Fallarini (born 4 May 1934) is an Italian racing cyclist. He rode in the 1958 Tour de France.

References

External links
 

1934 births
Living people
Italian male cyclists
Place of birth missing (living people)
Sportspeople from the Province of Novara
Cyclists from Piedmont